State Route 3 (SR 3) is a state highway in the U.S. state of California that serves Trinity and Siskiyou counties. It runs from SR 36 north along the shore of Trinity Lake, Fort Jones and Etna. The route then approaches Yreka, intersecting with Interstate 5 (I-5), and turns east to Montague. The road was numbered SR 3 in 1964, and most of it has been part of the state highway system since 1933.

Route description 

SR 3 begins at the junction with SR 36 south of the town of Peanut in Trinity County. SR 3 is also known as Bramlot Road from its southern terminus to Hayfork. This stretch of road through the Shasta-Trinity National Forest parallels the Hayfork River. Once SR 3 reaches the town of Hayfork, it travels along Hyampom Road east and snakes through the mountains to Douglas City and the junction with SR 299. From there, SR 3 runs concurrently with SR 299 north to the town of Weaverville. SR 3 then separates from SR 299, providing access to the Whiskeytown-Shasta-Trinity National Recreation Area and Trinity Dam along Lewiston Lake.

SR 3 passes through the towns of Covington Mill, Trinity Center, and Wyntoon before paralleling the Trinity River and Trinity Mountains as Weaverville-Scott Mountain Road and crossing the Scott Mountains and the Pacific Crest Trail into Siskiyou County.

In Siskiyou County, SR 3 passes through Callahan, Etna, Greenview, and Fort Jones as it turns northeast to intersect with Interstate 5 in Yreka. At this point, SR 263 continues in the northerly direction towards SR 96; SR 3 turns east to its northern terminus in the incorporated city of Montague.

SR 3 is part of the California Freeway and Expressway System, and a portion near the northern terminus is part of the National Highway System, a network of highways that are considered essential to the country's economy, defense, and mobility by the Federal Highway Administration. SR 3 is eligible to be included in the State Scenic Highway System, and is officially designated as a scenic highway by the California Department of Transportation for its entire length, meaning that it is a substantial section of highway passing through a "memorable landscape" with no "visual intrusions", where the potential designation has gained popular favor with the community.

The segment of SR 3 from Weaverville to Gazelle Callahan Road forms part of the Trinity Heritage Scenic Byway, a National Forest Scenic Byway.

In 2014, SR 3 had an annual average daily traffic (AADT) of 135 at U.S. Forest Service Road, and 10,000 at Moonlit Oaks Avenue, the latter of which was the highest AADT for the highway.

History 
The short piece from SR 36 north to Peanut was added to the state highway system in 1907 as part of the Peanut Road, which became Route 35 in 1917. Route 35 was extended north from Peanut to Route 20 (SR 299) near Douglas City in 1933, and simultaneously a new Route 82 was created, running from Route 3 (I-5) in the Yreka area southwest to Etna and east to Montague. The gap between Douglas City and Etna was filled in 1959 with an extension of Route 82 south to Route 20 near Weaverville; at the same time, the portion between Weaverville and Yreka was added to the California Freeway and Expressway System, which identifies the main routes of transportation in the state of California. The State Route 3 designation was applied to the Peanut-Montague roadway in the 1964 renumbering. The overlap with temporary I-5 (along the portion where SR 3 runs concurrently with Interstate 5 today) near Yreka was removed when the new I-5 bypass was built; the legislative definition was updated to reflect this in 1974, soon after the building of the bypass.

Major intersections

See also

References

External links 

 California @ AARoads.com – State Route 3
 Caltrans: Route 3 highway conditions
 California Highways: Route 3

003
State Route 003
State Route 003
Klamath Mountains
Trinity Mountains (California)
Weaverville, California
Yreka, California